Croft Circuit is a motor racing circuit located near Dalton-on-Tees in North Yorkshire, England. The circuit holds meetings of the British Touring Car Championship, British Rallycross and Pickup Truck Racing race series.

History 

The first records of racing at Croft date back to the 1920s, but it was after the Second World War that Croft circuit became a significant motorsport venue.

At the beginning of the Second World War an airfield named RAF Croft was built on the site now occupied by the circuit.  RAF Croft also known as Croft Aerodrome, was mainly used as a bomber airfield.  It was home to a number of different aircraft types including Wellington, Lancaster, Whitley, Stirling and Halifax bombers.

There were a number of notorious accidents mainly involving returning bombers missing their runway. The dead stump of the tree survived as a grim memorial on Atley Hill until it was grubbed out by the landowner in the mid 1990s.

Croft Aerodrome was home to a number of squadrons including 419 Squadron from Canada.  The platforms at the nearby Eryholme railway station were often crowded with airmen and ground crew during the war years.  The verges along the public access road to Croft Aerodrome were used to store racks of bombs and other military equipment, a fascinating attraction to local children at the time.

At the end of hostilities the aerodrome was abandoned by the RAF, it is still possible to see some military era buildings and structures surviving on nearby farmland, though most of the major structures such as hangars have been demolished and used as hardcore in the nearby villages of North Cowton, Dalton-on-Tees and Croft-on-Tees.

In 1947 businessman and councillor John Neasham acquired the lease to the land and formed Darlington and District Aero Club. However, the club folded after only 5 years and the airfield fell into disuse.

During the late 1940s and into the 1950s, Darlington & District Motor Club held Motor Race Meetings on various layouts utilising the runways and perimeter roads and then in 1962 Bruce Ropner and fellow enthusiasts bought half the venue at public auction, completing a track on the site in July 1964. The first meeting in August 1964, attracted a crowd of between 30,000 and 50,000 people.

Over the years the circuit has played host to many famous names and has hosted national and international meetings. However, slowly attention focussed on circuits in the south of England such as Brands Hatch, Silverstone and Lydden and in December 1967 Croft began hosting Rallycross. The events were utilised by ITV's World Of Sport and were televised live. Whilst Rallycross was considered to be a winter sport, circuit racing continued. By 1981 the profitability had fallen and with the circuit requiring a total resurfacing, it closed to circuit racing. Local farmer, George Shield, agreed a lease to run Rallycross and, in conjunction with Darlington & District Motor Club, successfully developed the track for this sport. Croft held the FIA Internations-Cup events of 1987 and 1990 as well as the 1994 British round of the FIA European Rallycross Championship.

With the attention brought by Rallycross the decision was taken to reintroduce tarmac racing and became a popular host of motorcycle and car racing.

British Touring Cars and British Superbikes soon came to the circuit.  British Superbikes remained a regular feature until 2011, while British Touring Cars remain a regular feature on the calendar.

A regular Monster Energy British Rallycross Championship fixture continues the long history of Rallycross at Croft.  The MSA British RallyCross Grand Prix featured at Croft in 2013.

Controversy 

In 2000, an official complaint was upheld by local residents over the noise produced by the racing car engines. This was claimed to be having an effect on some people's health, although Darlington Borough Council later quashed this, Croft Circuit gives a number of free tickets to local residents as compensation for the noise.

The circuit lost a court case in April 2008 and the claimants were awarded a total of £149,600 in compensation for the noise suffered but their request for an injunction against the existing operation of the circuit was refused. Both parties appealed this judgement. The appeal was heard on 15 January 2009 with the decision being made on 26 January 2009. The claimant's appeal was upheld; the injunction was granted and was the only substantive impact of the case. "Noisy days" were limited to 40 days. This had been the primary objective of the claimants and the outcome of the lawsuit was that the 40-day injunction was granted instead of monetary damages. The damage payments were therefore reduced to a nominal level, though the circuit was still liable for legal costs. The primary reasoning behind this outcome was that the circuit could make no reasonable case that its economic survival would be affected by this injunction. The circuit continues to operate its major race days which account for the vast majority of its revenue. (Feb 2009)

A copy of the appeal judgement can be found at http://www.bailii.org/ew/cases/EWCA/Civ/2009/15.html. (Feb 2009)

Major races 
Croft has been staging major races since 1996. They are the British Touring Car Championship (BTCC), along with support series Porsche Carrera Cup Great Britain, Renault Clio Cup, Historic Car Racing, and Ginetta Junior Championship: and formerly hosted the UK Formula Renault, UK Formula BMW, SEAT Leon Cupra Championship.

The British Superbike Championship left the calendar following the 2011 season and is not yet scheduled to return to Croft.

Croft last featured on the F3/GT calendar for the 2007 and the 2008 season.

Lap records 

The official race lap records at the Croft Circuit are listed as:

Rallying 

Croft Circuit has hosted stage rallies since at least 1983 including 2 stages in the Network Q RAC Rally 1996.

From 2001 Croft Circuit has frequently hosted the Christmas Stages Rally organised by Northallerton Automobile Club and Jack Frost Stages Rally organised by Darlington & District Motor Club. Both events used the circuit and roads within the venue during the winter months.

In 2021 British Automobile Racing Club (BARC) boss Ben Taylor issued a statement announcing "that Croft Circuit will not host rallying or rallycross events next season". This came under much criticism from fans and competitors.

However, on 4 September 2022 Northallerton Automobile Club and Darlington & District Motor Club announced a return of stage rallying to Croft Circuit with the Swift Signs & Shirts Winter Stages Rally running on Sunday 27 November 2022.

Notes

References

External links 

 Croft Circuit official site
 Croft Circuit history and track map from RacingCircuits.info
 BTCC
 BARC
 British RallyCross Championship

Motorsport venues in England